James Braidwood may refer to:

James Braidwood (firefighter) (1800–1861), Scottish firefighter, developed the modern fire service
James Braidwood (engineer) (1832–1879), Scottish-born US mining engineer and industrialist, namesake of Braidwood, Illinois
James Braidwood, prisoner on the St. Michael of Scarborough